Kausar Munir is an Indian lyricist and screen writer in Bollywood.

Biography 
Munir was born and brought up in Bandra, Mumbai. She graduated in English Literature from St. Xavier's College, Mumbai.

Munir married actor Nirmal Pandey in 1997 but they separated and divorced a few years later in 2000. She has been married to Naveen Pandita since 2001. They have a daughter Sophie Pandita.

Munir started working in media and started doing some research work. Munir is a lyricist who started her career in television with writing for the television serial Jassi Jaisi Koi Nahin. She went on to write Falak Tak for the film Tashan, followed by songs for Ishaqzaade, Ek Tha Tiger, Dhoom 3, Bajrangi Bhaijaan, Dear Zindagi.

She has also worked as a language consultant for the film English Vinglish. She has penned down several lyrics for Bollywood movies and is also working as script writer.

The official anthem for the 2021 ICC Men's T20 World Cup, "Live the game!, Love the game!", was written by Munir with music by Amit Trivedi and vocals from Sharvi Yadav and Anand Bhaskar. She incorporates the use "Hinglish" at intervals, with the song mostly being in English.

Filmography 
2022 Qala (lyricist)
2022 Rocket Boys (Indian Web Series) (dialogue writer)
2022 Gehraiyaan (lyricist)
2021 83 (lyricist)
2021 Rashmi Rocket (lyricist)
2021 Shiddat (lyricist)
2020 Gunjan Saxena: The Kargil Girl (lyricist)
2020 Guilty (lyricist)
2020 Yeh Ballet (lyricist)
2018 Jalebi (Writer)
2018 3 Dev (lyricist)
2018 Pad Man (lyricist)
2017 Secret Superstar (lyricist)
2017 Begum Jaan (Additional Screenplay, Dialogues, Lyrics)
2017 Meri Pyaari Bindu (lyricist)
2017 Qaidi Band (lyricist)
2016 Dear Zindagi (lyricist/additional writer)
2016 Raaz: Reboot (lyricist)
2016 Love Games (lyricist)
2016 Baarish Aur Chowmein (script and lyrics)
2015 Phantom (lyricist and dialogue writer)
2015 Bajrangi Bhaijaan (lyricist and dialogue writer)
2015 Shamitabh (lyricist)
2015 Tevar (lyricist)
2014 Heropanti (lyricist)
2014 Main Tera Hero (lyricist)
2014 Youngistaan (lyricist)
2014 Jai Ho (lyricist)
2013 Dhoom: 3 (lyricist)
2013 Bullett Raja (lyricist)
2013 Gori Tere Pyaar Mein (lyricist)
2013 Ishkq in Paris (lyricist)
2013 Nautanki Saala! (lyricist)
2012 Ajab Gazabb Love (lyricist)
2012 Ek Tha Tiger (lyricist)
2012 Ishaqzaade (lyricist)
2010 Anjaana Anjaani (lyrics: "Anjaana Anjaani")
2008 Tashan (lyrics: "Falak Tak")

Awards 

Winner: Filmfare Best Lyricist Award(2021) for Lehra Do song in the movie 83
Winner: Nexa IIFA Best Lyricist Award(2021) for Lehra Do song in the movie 83
Nomination: Album of The Year Mirchi Music Awards (2017) for Secret Superstar
Nomination: Lyricist of The Year Mirchi Music Awards (2017) for "Maana Ke Hum Yaar Nahin (Duet)" from Meri Pyaari Bindu
Nomination: Best Lyricist Filmfare Awards(2016)
Nomination: Best Lyricist Screen Awards (2016)
Nomination: Best Lyricist Filmfare Awards (2014)
Nomination: Lyricist of The Year Mirchi Music Awards (2014) for "Suno Na Sangemarmar" from Youngistaan
Nomination: Album of The Year Mirchi Music Awards  (2012) for Ishaqzaade
Winner: Best Lyricist Stardust Awards (2014)
Winner: Best Lyricist Star Screen Awards (2014)
Winner : Best Lyricist Zee Cine Award(2013)
Winner : Standout Performance By Lyricist Stardust Award(2013)
Winner : Standout Performance By Lyricist Stardust Award(2009)

References

External links
 
 

Indian lyricists
Hindi-language lyricists
Indian women songwriters
Indian Muslims
Living people
Hindi-language writers
Year of birth missing (living people)